Dub-Indrecht mac Cathail (died 768) was a King of Connacht from the Uí Briúin branch of the Connachta. He was the son of Cathal mac Muiredaig Muillethan (died 735), a previous king. He was of the Síl Cathail sept of the Ui Briun and ruled from 764 to 768.

In 766, Dub-Indrecht defeated the Conmhaícne Cúile Tuireadh at the Battle of Sruthair. His grandson, Fergus mac Fothaid (died 843), was a later king of Connacht.

See also
Kings of Connacht

Notes

References

 Annals of Tigernach
 Annals of Ulster
 Francis J.Byrne, Irish Kings and High-Kings
 The Chronology of the Irish Annals, Daniel P. McCarthy

External links
CELT: Corpus of Electronic Texts at University College Cork

768 deaths
Kings of Connacht
People from County Roscommon
8th-century Irish monarchs
Year of birth unknown
People of Conmaicne Cuile Toladh